XHVQ-FM is a radio station on 96.9 FM in Culiacán, Sinaloa, Mexico, known as Vibra Radio.

History 

XENP-AM 830—also known as XENSM—received its concession on May 15, 1964. It was originally located in Navolato and owned by Salvador Águilar Montenegro, whose family owned several local gas stations, operating as a 1,000-watt daytimer.  Within several years, the call sign was changed to XEVQ-AM, and station operations moved to Culiacán. By the 1980s, XEVQ was owned by Radio y Televisión del Noroeste and operating with 5,000 watts. In the 2000s, it added 1,000 watts at night.

XEVQ migrated to FM in 2011 as XHVQ-FM 96.9.

In June 2021, XHVQ-FM and its sister from Mazatlán, XHMAT-FM 99.5, withdrew from Grupo ACIR, changing to Vibra Radio on June 22, 2021.

References

Radio stations in Sinaloa